The BeBoard or BE_Board is a single-board computer, similar to Raspberry Pi, developed in Latvia by the Baltic Embedded.

A standard configuration BeBoard has 1 GHz i.MX53 Freescale ARM Cortex-A8 processor and 512MB DDR3-800 RAM.

References

Single-board computers